Dennard is a census-designated place in Van Buren County, Arkansas, United States. Its population was 496 as of the 2020 census.

History 
Dennard's post office was established in 1886. It first appeared as a census-designated place in the 2010 census.

Demographics

2020 census 

At the 2020 United States Census, there were 496 people and 216 households residing in Dennard.

2010 census 
At the 2010 United States census, there were 530 people, 220 households, and 148 families residing in Dennard. The racial makeup was 505 (95.3%) White, 0 (0.0%) Black, 0 (0.0%) Native American, 0 (0.0%) Asian, 0 (0.0%) Pacific Islander, 1 (0.2%) from other races, and 24 (4.5%) from two or more races. 7 people (1.3%) of any race were Hispanic or Latino.

There were 220 households, of which 51 (34.5%) had children under the age of 18 living with them, 112 (50.9%) were married couples living together, 23 (4.3%) were unmarried opposite-sex partnerships, 1 (0.2%) were unmarried same-sex partnerships, 27 (12.2%) had a female householder with no husband present, and 72 (32.7%) were non-families. 54 (24.5%) households were made up of individuals, and 20 (9.0%) had someone living alone who was 65 years of age or older. The average household size was 2.41, and the average family size was 2.86.

The population was spread out, with 123 people (23.2%) under the age of 18, 26 people (4.9%) aged 18 to 24, 116 people (21.8%) aged 25 to 44, 178 people (33.5%) aged 45 to 64, and 87 people (16.6%) who were 65 years of age or older. The median age was 45 years. For every 100 females, there were 100.8 males.

Education 
Public education for elementary and secondary school students is provided by the Clinton School District, which leads students to graduate from Clinton High School.

References

Census-designated places in Van Buren County, Arkansas